"Dual Spires" is the 12th episode of the fifth season of the American comedy-drama television series Psych, and the 75th episode overall. The episode was directed by Matt Shakman and written by Bill Callahan and series star James Roday Rodriguez. It originally aired December 1, 2010.

The episode is a homage to the television series Twin Peaks and features seven cast members of the series: Sherilyn Fenn, Sheryl Lee, Dana Ashbrook, Robyn Lively, Lenny Von Dohlen, Catherine E. Coulson, and Ray Wise. After receiving an e-mail inviting them to a cinnamon festival, Shawn Spencer (Roday Rodriguez) and Burton "Gus" Guster (Dulé Hill) travel to the quirky small town of Dual Spires. Once there, they are caught up in the mysterious drowning death of teenager Paula Merral.

"Dual Spires" received generally positive reviews from critics. According to the Nielsen ratings system, it drew 3.543 million viewers, with a 2.2/4 share among all households and a 1.3/4 share among those aged 18–49.

Plot
After receiving a flier by email inviting them to a cinnamon festival, private detectives Shawn Spencer (James Roday Rodriguez) and Burton "Gus" Guster (Dulé Hill) travel to the quirky small town of Dual Spires. Shawn and Gus eat cinnamon pie at the Sawmill Diner, an establishment owned by Robert "Bob" Barker (Dana Ashbrook) and his wife Michelle (Robyn Lively) and built on a sawmill that burned down in 1958, killing eight people. Soon, the body of Bob and Michelle's niece, Paula Merral (an anagram of Laura Palmer, the Twin Peaks murder victim), is found by a lake.

Sheriff Andrew Jackson (Lenny Von Dohlen) rules the death an accident, but Shawn receives the Dewey Decimal Classification number of a book, Reincarnation and Rebirth, the title of which parallels the revelation that Paula had supposedly drowned in Santa Barbara, California seven years earlier, though her body was never found. Bob reveals that Michelle's unstable sister Lucy left Dual Spires, taking with her Paula, whom Michelle and Bob had all but raised. When Paula sent them a letter detailing the drug use and child abuse, they helped Paula fake her death so she could leave Lucy. Detectives Juliet O'Hara (Maggie Lawson) and Carlton Lassiter (Timothy Omundson) reopen the case and leave to issue a warrant for Bob's arrest.

Shawn and Gus continue the investigation and, finding an entry in Paula's diary about meetings with "J", are led to partially blind photographer Jack Smith (Ryan McDonald).  Jack reveals a photograph of Sheriff Jackson's son Randy (Scott Lyster), taken just before Jack was attacked during a walk with Paula.  Randy reveals that after he attacked Jack, Paula confronted him about his ex-girlfriend, who Shawn deduces is librarian Maudette Hornsby (Sherilyn Fenn). However, Hornsby is found hanged at the library, and Sheriff Jackson and Dr. Donna "Doc" Gooden (Sheryl Lee) rule that Maudette killed Paula out of jealousy and committed suicide to keep the town from knowing about the affair. Shawn, however, deduces that Maudette was the one that led them to the festival and left clues for them to decode.

Suddenly, Shawn and Gus are locked in the library and it is lit on fire, but they are rescued by Father Peter Westley (Ray Wise). Bob, who is revealed to be Paula's biological father, explains that after World War I, his great-grandfather established the town with two other soldiers, intending to create a secluded utopia. After the sawmill fire in 1958, the town began to look at all outsiders as a threat. When Doc Gooden and Sheriff Jackson enter and hold him at gunpoint, Shawn deduces that they are the leaders of the other two founding families. Due to Gooden's infertility and Jackson's terminal cancer, Randy was the only known direct descendant and therefore the sole future leader. To stop Randy from leaving town with a paranoid Paula, the sheriff and doctor drowned her. After Lassiter and O'Hara arrive and arrest Gooden and Jackson, the group celebrates at the diner, only to be repulsed by a number of oddities referencing Twin Peaks.

Production

"Dual Spires" was the fourth episode directed by Matt Shakman, the sixth to be written by producer Bill Callahan, and sixth to be written by series star James Roday Rodriguez. It originally aired in the United States on December 1, 2010, on USA Network as the 12th episode of Psych fifth season and the 75th episode overall. It was an extended episode, at 67 minutes including commercials or 50 without.

According to trivia on the "Dual Spires enhanced" video at the Psych website, a Twin Peaks tribute episode had been in the works since season one. Maggie Lawson was the one who suggested the episode's title, a play on that of the original series. The episode aired 20 years to the day after the 16th episode of Twin Peaks, which answered the question of who killed Laura Palmer, after which, Mike Hale of The New York Times wrote, "there was really no reason to keep watching." The episode features seven Twin Peaks cast members as guest stars. Sherilyn Fenn, who is best known for portraying Audrey Horne, guest stars as Maudette Hornsby. Sheryl Lee, who played Laura Palmer and Maddy Ferguson, guest stars as Dr. Donna "Doc" Gooden, Dual Spires' psychiatrist, pediatrician, optometrist, gastrologist, podiatrist, dermatologist, orthodontist, forensic scientist, veterinarian, lawyer, and accountant. Dana Ashbrook, who played Bobby Briggs, guest stars as Robert "Bob" Barker. Robyn Lively, who played Lana Budding Milford, guest stars as Michelle Barker. Lenny Von Dohlen, who played Harold Smith, guest stars  as Sheriff Andrew Jackson. Catherine E. Coulson, who played the Log Lady, Margaret Lanterman, cameos as a woman carrying wood. Finally, Ray Wise, who played Leland Palmer, reprises his Psych role as Father Peter Westley. Michael Ontkean, who played Sheriff Harry S. Truman, and Mädchen Amick, who played diner waitress Shelly Johnson, were also approached to appear in the episode. Twin Peaks co-creator David Lynch was originally going to guest star in a speaking role as Mayor Douglas Fir, but Lynch was not asked due to Roday Rodriguez's concern over what Lynch would think of the episode. Other guest stars include Scott Lyster as Randy Jackson and Ryan McDonald as Jack Smith.

Additionally, Julee Cruise, who recorded the theme for Twin Peaks, recorded a slower, extended version of the Psych theme song, "I Know You Know" by series creator Steve Franks's band The Friendly Indians. The imagery that accompanies it is an almost shot-for-shot recreation of the Twin Peaks opening sequence, with a white horse that resembles the one in Sarah Palmer's vision before the attack on Maddy Ferguson. Later, during a bicycle chase scene, "Baby Did a Bad Bad Thing" by Chris Isaak is heard. Isaak portrayed Special Agent Chester Desmond in Twin Peaks: Fire Walk with Me.

Cultural references

Allusions to Twin Peaks

"Dual Spires" is presented as an homage to Twin Peaks, and CNN writer Katie McLaughlin noted several allusions the episode makes to the series. In the beginning of the episode, there is a chocolate bunny on Shawn's desk. In Twin Peaks, Special Agent Dale Cooper (Kyle MacLachlan) delivered the famous line "Diane, I'm holding in my hands a small box of chocolate bunnies." Gus then asks, "Since when is the sound of opening and closing shades so disruptive that it needs to be alleviated?" The character Nadine Hurley in Twin Peaks attempted to patent her silent drape runner invention. Someone from a website by the name of UnderTheNail.com sends Shawn and Gus an e-mail that says, "Who killed Paula Merral?" Twin Peaks famed the catchphrase "Who Killed Laura Palmer?" (Paula Merral is an anagram for Laura Palmer.) The killer also purposely placed clues in his victims' fingernail beds.. Ray Wise, who played Leland Palmer, also reprises his role as Father Westley, but when he arrives to rescue Shawn and Gus, his hair has gone white (which he attributes to a nun having failed to do his hair properly, and is a reference to Leland's hair going white from grief after Laura's death).

The "enhanced" video states that there are 724 references to Twin Peaks in the episode's closing scene. Among them, Jack Smith wears an eye patch and a red suit and dances funny, referencing not only the aforementioned "One Eyes Jacks" brothel and Nadine Hurley, but a dream sequence in Peaks, where a character known as the Man from Another Place wore a similar suit and danced in a bizarre fashion. In the final scene Carlton is seen holding his hand up and stating "that is a damn fine cup of cider". In the Twin Peaks pilot Agent Cooper holds his hand the same way and states "that is a damn fine cup of coffee." Additionally, Carlton is later holding a cup of coffee on its side, displaying that the coffee is now solid in a fashion mimicking the same action by Agent Cooper in the final episode. A seven-foot tall man (John DeSantis) wearing a bow tie looks much like the giant from Agent Cooper's dream. Randy is seen at the end barking out the window like Bobby Briggs did to James Hurley in the holding cells. Bob Barker is seen dancing with a picture just as Leland Palmer did in Twin Peaks. The episode's end credits are accompanied by soap opera-type music and a shot of Paula's prom picture; Twin Peaks credits did exactly the same thing with Laura's photo.
The music is also very similar to the theme.

Other references
There are several other references in the episode. Upon seeing an African American for the first time, a child asks Gus if he is Frederick Douglass. When Shawn makes the observation that Dual Spires has "Bob Barker, Doc Gooden, and Randy Jackson, all living in the same inlet town with no cars, cell phones, or internet", Gus replies that they should pitch the concept to Mark Burnett. Shawn and Gus later ride a tandem bicycle in what Shawn likens to a racially reversed Driving Miss Daisy. Randy reveals that the town gathers every week to watch Everwood. Shawn tells Maudette that they are having a Betty Boop Night at the Roadhouse.

Reception
According to the Nielsen ratings system, "Dual Spires" drew 3.543 million viewers, with a 2.2/4 share among all households, meaning that in the United States the episode was tuned into by roughly 2.2 percent of all television-equipped households and 4 percent of households watching television. The episode had a 1.3/4 share among those aged 18–49.

The episode received positive reviews from critics familiar with Twin Peaks. Jonah Krakow of IGN gave the episode a score of 9 out of 10, writing that it was "enjoyable enough on its own merits that I don't have to apologize for gushing over every single subtle nod to Twin Peaks." Although CNN's Katie McLaughlin was initially worried, her fears were quickly alleviated. McLaughlin stated that Psych did a "damn fine" tribute episode, and that she had fun finding all of the Twin Peaks references. Simon Abrams of The A.V. Club gave the episode a rating of C− on a scale of A+ to F. Commenting on reports that the episode has been in the works since the series' first season, Abrams wrote, "[it] speaks to how patently unnecessary "Dual Spires" is conceptually but also how potentially endearing it could be, too." JT Vaughn of Zap2it, however, gave the episode an A+ rating, writing, "It was just an absolutely brilliant episode, one which paid a loving homage to a classic television show while also being a damn fine episode in itself. Psych has been in great form since it returned, and long may it continue." In contrast, Starpulse writer Brittany Frederick, who was unfamiliar with Twin Peaks, enjoyed "Dual Spires" less than other episodes.

References

External links
 
 "Dual Spires" at USA Network

Psych episodes
2010 American television episodes
Twin Peaks
Television episodes directed by Matt Shakman